The Oryol Constituency (No.145) is a Russian legislative constituency covering the entirety of Oryol Oblast.

Members elected

Election results

1993

|-
! colspan=2 style="background-color:#E9E9E9;text-align:left;vertical-align:top;" |Candidate
! style="background-color:#E9E9E9;text-align:left;vertical-align:top;" |Party
! style="background-color:#E9E9E9;text-align:right;" |Votes
! style="background-color:#E9E9E9;text-align:right;" |%
|-
|style="background-color:"|
|align=left|Aleksandr Voropaev
|align=left|Independent
|
|18.62%
|-
|style="background-color:"|
|align=left|Aleksey Zotikov
|align=left|Communist Party
| -
|14.93%
|-
| colspan="5" style="background-color:#E9E9E9;"|
|- style="font-weight:bold"
| colspan="3" style="text-align:left;" | Total
| 
| 100%
|-
| colspan="5" style="background-color:#E9E9E9;"|
|- style="font-weight:bold"
| colspan="4" |Source:
|
|}

1995

|-
! colspan=2 style="background-color:#E9E9E9;text-align:left;vertical-align:top;" |Candidate
! style="background-color:#E9E9E9;text-align:left;vertical-align:top;" |Party
! style="background-color:#E9E9E9;text-align:right;" |Votes
! style="background-color:#E9E9E9;text-align:right;" |%
|-
|style="background-color:"|
|align=left|Aleksey Zotikov
|align=left|Communist Party
|
|33.37%
|-
|style="background-color:"|
|align=left|Tamara Konovalova
|align=left|Agrarian Party
|
|21.99%
|-
|style="background-color:"|
|align=left|Nikolay Yudin
|align=left|Independent
|
|9.39%
|-
|style="background-color:"|
|align=left|Sergey Isakov
|align=left|Liberal Democratic Party
|
|5.69%
|-
|style="background-color:#23238E"|
|align=left|Vyacheslav Golenkov
|align=left|Our Home – Russia
|
|5.28%
|-
|style="background-color:"|
|align=left|Aleksandr Vasilkovsky
|align=left|Independent
|
|4.13%
|-
|style="background-color:#2C299A"|
|align=left|Vladimir Zyabkin
|align=left|Congress of Russian Communities
|
|3.12%
|-
|style="background-color:"|
|align=left|Irina Salnikova
|align=left|Independent
|
|2.70%
|-
|style="background-color:"|
|align=left|Nikolay Dolzhikov
|align=left|Independent
|
|1.98%
|-
|style="background-color:"|
|align=left|Nikolay Lyuty
|align=left|Independent
|
|1.98%
|-
|style="background-color:#000000"|
|colspan=2 |against all
|
|8.65%
|-
| colspan="5" style="background-color:#E9E9E9;"|
|- style="font-weight:bold"
| colspan="3" style="text-align:left;" | Total
| 
| 100%
|-
| colspan="5" style="background-color:#E9E9E9;"|
|- style="font-weight:bold"
| colspan="4" |Source:
|
|}

1999

|-
! colspan=2 style="background-color:#E9E9E9;text-align:left;vertical-align:top;" |Candidate
! style="background-color:#E9E9E9;text-align:left;vertical-align:top;" |Party
! style="background-color:#E9E9E9;text-align:right;" |Votes
! style="background-color:#E9E9E9;text-align:right;" |%
|-
|style="background-color:"|
|align=left|Aleksandr Labeykin
|align=left|Communist Party
|
|62.75%
|-
|style="background-color:#020266"|
|align=left|Aleksandr Kasyanov
|align=left|Russian Socialist Party
|
|6.62%
|-
|style="background-color:#004BBC"|
|align=left|Sergey Bogatishchev
|align=left|Russian Cause
|
|4.98%
|-
|style="background-color:"|
|align=left|Aleksandr Yepimakhov
|align=left|Russian All-People's Union
|
|3.42%
|-
|style="background-color:"|
|align=left|Aleksey Yegurnov
|align=left|Independent
|
|2.98%
|-
|style="background-color:#084284"|
|align=left|Vladimir Pochechikin
|align=left|Spiritual Heritage
|
|2.55%
|-
|style="background-color:#000000"|
|colspan=2 |against all
|
|15.24%
|-
| colspan="5" style="background-color:#E9E9E9;"|
|- style="font-weight:bold"
| colspan="3" style="text-align:left;" | Total
| 
| 100%
|-
| colspan="5" style="background-color:#E9E9E9;"|
|- style="font-weight:bold"
| colspan="4" |Source:
|
|}

2003

|-
! colspan=2 style="background-color:#E9E9E9;text-align:left;vertical-align:top;" |Candidate
! style="background-color:#E9E9E9;text-align:left;vertical-align:top;" |Party
! style="background-color:#E9E9E9;text-align:right;" |Votes
! style="background-color:#E9E9E9;text-align:right;" |%
|-
|style="background-color:"|
|align=left|Ivan Mosyakin
|align=left|Independent
|
|47.26%
|-
|style="background-color:#004090"|
|align=left|Aleksey Kuzmin
|align=left|New Course — Automobile Russia
|
|14.47%
|-
|style="background-color:"|
|align=left|Sergey Bavykin
|align=left|Liberal Democratic Party
|
|7.11%
|-
|style="background-color:#1042A5"|
|align=left|Sergey Tarasov
|align=left|Union of Right Forces
|
|4.89%
|-
|style="background-color:#DBB726"|
|align=left|Vladimir Zyabkin
|align=left|Democratic Party
|
|3.68%
|-
|style="background-color:#164C8C"|
|align=left|Dmitry Shchipakov
|align=left|United Russian Party Rus'
|
|2.27%
|-
|style="background-color:#000000"|
|colspan=2 |against all
|
|18.32%
|-
| colspan="5" style="background-color:#E9E9E9;"|
|- style="font-weight:bold"
| colspan="3" style="text-align:left;" | Total
| 
| 100%
|-
| colspan="5" style="background-color:#E9E9E9;"|
|- style="font-weight:bold"
| colspan="4" |Source:
|
|}

2016

|-
! colspan=2 style="background-color:#E9E9E9;text-align:left;vertical-align:top;" |Candidate
! style="background-color:#E9E9E9;text-align:leftt;vertical-align:top;" |Party
! style="background-color:#E9E9E9;text-align:right;" |Votes
! style="background-color:#E9E9E9;text-align:right;" |%
|-
| style="background-color: " |
|align=left|Nikolay Kovalyov
|align=left|United Russia
|
|46.52%
|-
|style="background-color:"|
|align=left|Vasily Ikonnikov
|align=left|Communist Party
|
|20.21%
|-
|style="background-color:"|
|align=left|Andrey Kutsyn
|align=left|Liberal Democratic Party
|
|9.24%
|-
|style="background:"| 
|align=left|Ruslan Perelygin
|align=left|A Just Russia
|
|7.97%
|-
|style="background:"| 
|align=left|Mikhail Vakarev
|align=left|Communists of Russia
|
|3.88%
|-
|style="background:"| 
|align=left|Aleksandr Kirillov
|align=left|Yabloko
|
|2.03%
|-
|style="background:"| 
|align=left|Andrey Korneev
|align=left|Party of Growth
|
|1.79%
|-
|style="background:"| 
|align=left|Igor Fedorov
|align=left|Civic Platform
|
|1.64%
|-
|style="background:"| 
|align=left|Igor Komov
|align=left|People's Freedom Party
|
|1.38%
|-
|style="background-color:"|
|align=left|Viktor Motorny
|align=left|Rodina
|
|1.22%
|-
| colspan="5" style="background-color:#E9E9E9;"|
|- style="font-weight:bold"
| colspan="3" style="text-align:left;" | Total
| 
| 100%
|-
| colspan="5" style="background-color:#E9E9E9;"|
|- style="font-weight:bold"
| colspan="4" |Source:
|
|}

2019

|-
! colspan=2 style="background-color:#E9E9E9;text-align:left;vertical-align:top;" |Candidate
! style="background-color:#E9E9E9;text-align:left;vertical-align:top;" |Party
! style="background-color:#E9E9E9;text-align:right;" |Votes
! style="background-color:#E9E9E9;text-align:right;" |%
|-
|style="background-color: " |
|align=left|Olga Pilipenko
|align=left|United Russia
|152,073
|53.62%
|-
|style="background-color: " |
|align=left|Ivan Dynkovich
|align=left|Communist Party
|45,303
|15.97%
|-
|style="background-color:" |
|align=left|Oleg Timokhin
|align=left|Party of Pensioners
|23,165
|8.17%
|-
|style="background-color: " |
|align=left|Ruslan Perelygin
|align=left|A Just Russia
|16,724
|5.90%
|-
|style="background-color: " |
|align=left|Roman Neverov
|align=left|Liberal Democratic Party
|12,929
|4.56%
|-
|style="background-color: " |
|align=left|Valery Chudo
|align=left|Yabloko
|10,169
|3.59%
|-
|style="background-color: " |
|align=left|Mikhail Orlov
|align=left|Communists of Russia
|9,909
|3.50%
|-
|style="background-color: " |
|align=left|Sergey Kuznetsov
|align=left|Rodina
|5,281
|1.86%
|-
| colspan="5" style="background-color:#E9E9E9;"|
|- style="font-weight:bold"
| colspan="3" style="text-align:left;" | Total
| 283,631
| 100%
|-
| colspan="5" style="background-color:#E9E9E9;"|
|- style="font-weight:bold"
| colspan="4" |Source:
|
|}

2021

|-
! colspan=2 style="background-color:#E9E9E9;text-align:left;vertical-align:top;" |Candidate
! style="background-color:#E9E9E9;text-align:left;vertical-align:top;" |Party
! style="background-color:#E9E9E9;text-align:right;" |Votes
! style="background-color:#E9E9E9;text-align:right;" |%
|-
|style="background-color:"|
|align=left|Olga Pilipenko (incumbent)
|align=left|United Russia
|
|36.51%
|-
|style="background-color:"|
|align=left|Vasily Ikonnikov
|align=left|Communist Party
|
|17.21%
|-
|style="background-color: " |
|align=left|Ruslan Perelygin
|align=left|A Just Russia — For Truth
|
|12.44%
|-
|style="background-color: "|
|align=left|Svetlana Kovaleva
|align=left|New People
|
|6.64%
|-
|style="background-color: "|
|align=left|Raisa Yevdikomova
|align=left|Party of Pensioners
|
|6.16%
|-
|style="background-color: "|
|align=left|Nikita Zakharenko
|align=left|Communists of Russia
|
|5.70%
|-
|style="background-color:"|
|align=left|Vladislav Chislov
|align=left|Liberal Democratic Party
|
|4.85%
|-
|style="background:"| 
|align=left|Nikolay Volkov
|align=left|Civic Platform
|
|3.18%
|-
|style="background-color: "|
|align=left|Sergey Mosin
|align=left|Party of Growth
|
|1.74%
|-
| colspan="5" style="background-color:#E9E9E9;"|
|- style="font-weight:bold"
| colspan="3" style="text-align:left;" | Total
| 
| 100%
|-
| colspan="5" style="background-color:#E9E9E9;"|
|- style="font-weight:bold"
| colspan="4" |Source:
|
|}

Notes

References

Russian legislative constituencies
Politics of Oryol Oblast